The 2008 United States presidential election in Maine took place on November 4, 2008, and was part of the 2008 United States presidential election. Maine is one of two states in the U.S. that instead of all of the state's four electors of the Electoral College to vote based upon the statewide results of the voters, two of the individual electors vote based on their congressional district because Maine has two congressional districts. The other two electors vote based upon the statewide results. See below in the section of Electors for more information.

Maine once again displayed its status as a blue state, with Democrat Barack Obama taking the state with 57.71% of the vote and a difference of 126,650 votes. Maine is one of only two states, along with Nebraska, to not allocate its electoral votes via a winner-take-all system; rather, two electoral votes are allocated to the statewide winner and one for the winner in each individual congressional district. Maine at-large and its 1st district has voted Democratic since 1992, and the 2nd district did the same until Donald Trump won it in 2016 and 2020. It is also the only state in New England where a county voted for Republican John McCain, with Piscataquis County giving McCain roughly 50.7% of the vote.

Caucuses
 2008 Maine Democratic presidential caucuses
 2008 Maine Republican presidential caucuses

Campaign

Predictions
There were 16 news organizations who made state-by-state predictions of the election. Here are their last predictions before election day:

Polling

Obama won every single pre-election poll. The final 3 polls averaged Obama leading 55% to 39%.

Fundraising
John McCain raised a total of $465,676 in the state, while Barack Obama raised $2,205,059.

Advertising and visits
Obama spent $1,216,060 while McCain and the RNC spent $444,529. The Obama ticket didn't visit the state, but both McCain and Palin visited Maine once.

Analysis
Maine is located in New England, an area that has become a Democratic Party stronghold. It was once a classic Yankee Republican state. It identified with the newly formed GOP in 1856 and stayed in the GOP fold for most of the next 132 years. The GOP carried the state in all but three elections (1912, 1964 and 1968) from 1856 to 1988. Additionally, Maine and Vermont were the only two states that voted against Franklin D. Roosevelt in all four of his campaigns. However, no Republican presidential nominee has carried Maine since George H. W. Bush in 1988, leading many analysts to reckon the state as part of the solid bloc of blue states in the Northeast. While George W. Bush seriously contested the state in 2000 and 2004, polls in 2008 never showed anything but a significant Obama lead.  

Ultimately, Obama won the state by a comfortable margin, taking 57.71% of the vote--the highest percentage by a Democrat in Maine since Lyndon B. Johnson carried it as part of his 44-state landslide in 1964, although Bill Clinton in 1996 won with a wider margin when third parties were a factor. As evidence of how Democratic Maine has become, George W. Bush at the time was only the second Republican ever to win the White House without carrying Maine, the first being Richard Nixon in 1968 when Maine Senator Edmund Muskie was the Democratic vice-presidential nominee. At the same time, however, incumbent Republican U.S. Senator Susan Collins defeated former Democratic U.S. Representative Tom Allen and won reelection to a third term with 61.33% of the vote. Maine was the only state carried by Obama to elect a Republican to the U.S. Senate in 2008.

The seat in Maine's 1st Congressional District that was vacated by Tom Allen in his unsuccessful bid for the U.S. Senate was retained by Democrat Chellie Pingree. At the state level, Democrats made gains in the Maine Legislature, picking up six seats in the Maine House of Representatives and one seat in the Maine Senate.

Results

Statewide

Congressional District
Barack Obama swept both of Maine’s two congressional districts.

By county

Counties that flipped from Republican to Democratic
 Washington (largest borough: Calais)

Electors

Technically the voters of Maine cast their ballots for electors: representatives to the Electoral College. Maine is allocated 4 electors because it has 2 congressional districts and 2 senators. All candidates who appear on the ballot or qualify to receive write-in votes must submit a list of 4 electors, who pledge to vote for their candidate their running mate. Whoever wins the majority of votes in the state is awarded just 2 of the electoral votes. The other 2 electoral votes are based upon the congressional district results. Their chosen electors then vote for president and vice president. Although electors are pledged to their candidate and running mate, they are not obligated to vote for them. An elector who votes for someone other than their candidate is known as a faithless elector.

The electors of each state and the District of Columbia met on December 15, 2008, to cast their votes for president and vice president. The Electoral College itself never meets as one body. Instead the electors from each state and the District of Columbia met in their respective capitols. 

The following were the members of the Electoral College from the state. Since Obama won both congressional districts, all 4 were pledged to Barack Obama and Joe Biden:

 Robert O'Brien of Portland, ME.  He works in a hardware store and has been active with the Democratic Party since 1984.
 Jill Duson, of Portland, ME.  She's a third term city councilor and a former mayor.
 Samuel Shapiro of Waterville, ME.  He's been a party activist since 1953 and is a former state treasurer.
 Tracie Reed of Portland, ME.  She's a master's candidate in the University of Massachusetts Amherst's architecture program and a political organizer.

See also
 United States presidential elections in Maine

References

Maine
President
2008